Pamukören is a small town in the District of Kuyucak, Aydın Province, Turkey. In 2010 it had a population of 3,364.

References

Villages in Kuyucak District